The Copa del Generalísimo 1969 Final was the 67th final of the King's Cup. The final was played at Santiago Bernabéu in Madrid, on 15 June 1969, being won by Club Atlético de Bilbao, who beat Elche CF 1-0.

Details

References

1969
Copa
Athletic Bilbao matches
Elche CF matches